Abee is an enstatite chondrite meteorite that fell on 9 June 1952 in Alberta, Canada.

History
The Abee meteorite fell at 11:05 p.m. on 9 June 1952.

Classification
Abee is classified as an enstatite chondrite with a petrologic type 4, thus belonging to the group EH4. It is the only example in the world of an EH4 impact-melt breccia meteorite.

References

External links

See also
Glossary of meteoritics
Meteorite fall

Meteorites found in Canada
1952 in Alberta